The 1939 Oga earthquake struck Akita Prefecture, Japan on May 1, 1939. This event was a doublet earthquake, in which the mainshock occurred at 14:58 (JST),  6.8 ( 7.0), and an aftershock at 15:00 (JST),  6.7 ( 6.5). The earthquake left 27 people dead and 52 people injured, and 479 homes were destroyed.

References

External links
 

May 1939 events
1939 in Japan
1939 earthquakes
Earthquakes of the Showa period
Doublet earthquakes